
Bonigersee is a lake at Törbel in the canton of Valais, Switzerland. Its surface area is 0.9 ha. The raised bog is listed in the Federal Inventory of Raised and Transitional Bogs of National Importance and the Federal Inventory of Amphibian Spawning Areas.

Lakes of Valais
Protected areas of Switzerland